Stephen, Steven, or Steve Marshall may refer to:

Politics 
 Steve Marshall (politician) (born 1964), Attorney General of Alabama
 Steven Marshall (born 1968), 46th Premier of South Australia

Sports 
 Steve Marshall (wrestler) (born 1960), Canadian wrestler
 Steven Marshall (volleyball) (born 1989), Canadian volleyball player

Crime 
 Stephen Marshall, found guilty of the murder of Jeffrey Howe in England in 2009
 Stephen Marshall (murderer) (1985–2006), American-Canadian who shot two sex offenders in Maine in 2006

Others 
 Stephen Marshall (minister) (c.1594–1655), English Nonconformist minister
 Steven Marshall (businessman) (1957–2017), British business executive, chief executive of Railtrack
 Stephen Marshall (writer), Canadian writer, film director, and internet entrepreneur
 Steve Marshall (magician), American magician, clown, writer and artist

See also 
 Steven Marshall Crabb (born 1943), former member of the Victorian Legislative Assembly
 Stephen
 Steve
 Marshall (name)